APCA may refer to:

 Advanced Perceptual Contrast Algorithm
 Agrupación de Comandos Anfibios (Amphibious Commandos Group), a special operations force of the Argentine Marine Corps
 Arthur – Pieman Conservation Area, in Tasmania, Australia
 Associação Paulista de Críticos de Arte, arts award organization based in São Paulo, Brazil
 Australian Payments Clearing Association